Matthew Somerville Morgan (27 April 1837 – 2 June 1890) was an artist known mainly for his political cartoons in various publications. He also did theater posters for major American acts in both the United States and Great Britain.

Biography

Early life
Morgan was born in London. His father was an actor and music teacher; his mother, Mary Somerville, an actress and singer. The son studied scene painting and followed his profession at London's Princess's Theatre, but became artist and correspondent for the Illustrated London News. In 1859 Morgan worked in northern Italy covering the bloody Franco-Austrian War. He also studied in Paris, Italy, and Spain, and was one of the first artists to penetrate into the interior of Africa, which he did in 1858 by way of French Algeria. In 1859, he reported the Second Italian War of Independence for the News.

UK career
He became joint editor and proprietor of the Tomahawk, a comic illustrated London paper, and its artist. By 21 September 1861, the London publication Fun began its run, with Morgan on board as an artist.

The most notable of his cartoons were attacks on the royal family, the first that were ever made. He was associated with F. C. Burnand, W. S. Gilbert, and others, in the establishment of the London humor magazine Fun; his first "big cut" came out on 28 December 1861. He continued to draw the main cartoon for Fun until October 1864. A volume of his cartoons in this paper has been published under the title American War Cartoons (London, 1874). He was principal scene painter to the Royal Italian Opera, Covent Garden.

United States

He came to the United States in 1870 under an engagement with Frank Leslie, and, after working as caricaturist on Leslie's publications, acted as manager of several New York theatres. His greatest fame came during the 1872 presidential campaign, when Morgan drew cartoons on behalf of the Liberal Republicans against President Ulysses S. Grant.  Hired as a rival to the Republican cartoonist Thomas Nast at Harper's Weekly, Morgan showed much the same caustic satire, but lacked the humor and wit that Nast employed.  His caricatures of politicians he approved of were more like portraiture. By 1874, 'Leslie's Illustrated Weekly' was using Morgan's cartoons only sporadically, and relying more on those of Joseph Keppler, but Morgan continued to do illustrations of events and American scenes. He went in 1880 to Cincinnati, Ohio, where he was manager of the Strobridge Lithographing Company until 1885, and did much to improve the character of theatrical lithography. He also founded the Matt Morgan Art Pottery Company there in 1883, and the Cincinnati Art Students' League. Reportedly he also helped design sets for Buffalo Bill's Wild West Show.

He returned to New York City in 1887. Morgan contributed to the exhibitions of the American Watercolor Society, and painted a series of large panoramic pictures, representing battles of the Civil War, which were exhibited in Cincinnati in 1886 and elsewhere.

Morgan died of pericarditis and pleurisy in New York City on 2 June 1890.

Gallery

Notes

References

  This reference gives his  birthdate as 27 April 1839.

1837 births
1890 deaths
English cartoonists
19th-century English painters
English male painters
English caricaturists
English emigrants to the United States
19th-century English male artists